Robert Hennion (17 February 1898 – 18 January 1984) was a French film director

Assistant director 
 1939 :  Thérèse Martin  de Maurice de Canonge 
 1946 : Les Trois Tambours de Maurice de Canonge
 1946 : Mission spéciale de Maurice de Canonge

Director 
 1947: Ploum, ploum, tra-la-la or De porte en porte 
 1948: Et dix de der ! 
 1948: 
 1950: The Atomic Monsieur Placido 
 1951: L'Alsace d'hier et de demain (short film, black and white documentary)

External links 
Filmographie sélective
Filmographie
Biographie

French film directors
1898 births
1984 deaths
People from Colombes